The Fleischmann Atmospherium Planetarium was built in 1963 on the University of Nevada, Reno campus. It was the first planetarium in the United States to feature a 360-degree projector capable of providing horizon-to-horizon images and through time-lapse photography showing an entire day's weather in a few minutes.

Currently it offers public star shows.

The planetarium's uniquely shaped building, a hyperbolic paraboloid, was designed by famed Reno architect Raymond M. Hellmann and is listed on the National Register of Historic Places.

References

External links

 
 A Guide to the Fleischmann Planetarium and Science Center Records, AC 0454. University Archives, University Libraries, University of Nevada, Reno.

1960s architecture in the United States
1963 establishments in Nevada
University and college buildings completed in 1963
Buildings and structures in Reno, Nevada
Modernist architecture in Nevada
Museums in Reno, Nevada
National Register of Historic Places in Reno, Nevada
Nevada State Register of Historic Places
Planetaria in the United States
Science museums in Nevada
University and college buildings on the National Register of Historic Places in Nevada
University of Nevada, Reno